Edward Wallace Best (11 September 1917 – 1992) was an Australian athlete who competed in the third British Empire Games (forerunner of the modern Commonwealth Games), held in Sydney in February 1938. Best also held the office of Lord Mayor of Melbourne from 1969–71.

At the 1938 Empire Games he won the bronze medal in the men's 100 yards event as well as in the 220 yards competition. He was also a member of the Australian relay team (along with Alf Watson, Teddy Hampson and Howard Yates) that won the bronze medal in the 4×110 yards contest.

Enlisting in the 2/22nd Battalion, Best was captured in New Britain (an island of New Guinea) by the Japanese in 1942. Photos held at the Australian War Memorial show him with other Allied prisoners of war at Zentsuji Camp at Shikoku, Osaka.

Educated at Wesley College, Melbourne, he was the son of Edward Best AFL Fitzroy footballer and a nephew of politician Sir Robert Best.

External links
 Edward 'Ted' Best at Australian Athletics Historical Results

1917 births
1992 deaths
20th-century Australian politicians
Athletes (track and field) at the 1938 British Empire Games
Athletes from Melbourne
Australian Army officers
Australian Army personnel of World War II
Australian male sprinters
Australian prisoners of war
Commonwealth Games bronze medallists for Australia
Commonwealth Games medallists in athletics
Mayors and Lord Mayors of Melbourne
People educated at Wesley College (Victoria)
World War II prisoners of war held by Japan
Medallists at the 1938 British Empire Games